George N. Christy (born George Harrington) (November 6, 1827 – May 12, 1868) was one of the leading blackface performers during the early years of the blackface minstrel show in the 1840s.

Born in Palmyra, New York, his career began as a star performer with his stepfather E. P. Christy's troupe Christy's Minstrels; in two and a half years with them he earned $19,680, a fortune for those times. Jim Comer credits him with inventing "the line", the structured grouping that constituted the first act of the standardized 3-act minstrel show, with the interlocutor in the middle and "Mr. Tambo" and "Mr. Bones" on the ends.

He died in New York City from cerebral edema in 1868.

Notes

Sources
The National cyclopaedia of American biography, Volume 7

References
 Belcher, W.H., Interesting Career of Judge John W. Rea, originally from Passaic County Historical Publication, Vol. II, No. 1, September 1, 1931. Retrieved September 6, 2005.
 Comer, Jim, Every Time I Turn Around: Rite, Reversal, and the end of blackface minstrelsy. Retrieved September 6, 2005.
 Lott, Eric. Love and Theft: Blackface Minstrelsy and the American Working Class. New York: Oxford University Press, 1993. .

Further reading
 Gleasons Pictorial, 1854

Blackface minstrel performers
19th-century American male actors
American male stage actors
People from Palmyra, New York
1827 births
1868 deaths